Times Now is an English news channel in India owned and operated by The Times Group. The channel launched on 23 January 2006 in partnership with Reuters. It is a pay television throughout India. Until 2016, it was India's most popular and the most viewed English news channel.

History
In 2016 Arnab Goswami (the earlier editor-in-chief) left the channel to launch Republic TV.

Distribution
Along with the other Times group channels (Zoom, ET Now and Movies Now), Times Now is distributed by Media Network and Distribution (India) Ltd (MNDIL), which is a joint venture between The Times Group and Yogesh Radhakrishnan, a cable and satellite industry veteran, under the brand Prime Connect.

Employees
 Rahul Shivshankar – Editor-in-chief
 Navika Kumar – Group editor 
 Maroof Raza – Consultant and strategic affairs expert

Lawsuits
On 15 November 2011, in the country's highest defamation suit, the Supreme Court upheld the Bombay High Court's order requiring Times Now to pay ₹100 crore. The channel had erroneously run the picture of Supreme Court judge P.B. Sawant picture instead of someone similarly named as part of a Provident Fund scandal, and the payment went directly to Sawant.

In 2018, Times Now aired derogatory remarks about activist Sanjukta Basu. She filed a complaint with the News Broadcasting Standards Authority in March 2019. In October 2020 she moved Supreme Court claiming that her case was pending with NBSA. Before the case could be listed for hearing in the Supreme court, NBSA released the judgement on her complaint. NBSA ordered Times Now to air apology on live TV at 8PM and 9PM during the prime time and submit DVD copies of the same. NBSA found that Times Now had not contacted Basu to get her version and failed to verify the facts before broadcasting. This conduct was judged to be a violation of NBSA guidelines. The NBSA order noted that "there was an absence of neutrality in the programme".

Violation of Code of Ethics and Broadcasting Standards 
Times Now was accused of misrepresenting facts regarding an interview of an alleged eve teaser. The News Broadcasting Standards Authority asked Times Now to apologize and fined them ₹50,000.

The National Broadcasting Standards Authority (NBSA) reprimanded the channel for a bias in their coverage of the Tablighi Jamaat congregation on 23 June 2016 for violating the Code of Ethics and Broadcasting Standards.

2020 Delhi riots
In 2021, the National Broadcasting and Digital Standards Authority (NBDSA) found that debates by two Times Now anchors – Rahul Shivshankar and Padmaja Joshi on the topic 2020 Delhi riots were not conducted in an "impartial and objective manner". NBDSA found that the anchors had "violated the Fundamental Principles as enumerated in the Code of Ethics and Broadcasting Standards and various Guidelines issued by NBDSA". In his order NBDSA chairperson Justice (retired) A.K. Sikri directed Times Now to take down videos of from YouTube and websites. NBDSA had ordered this responding to the complaint filed against Shivshankar accusing him of selectively showing the observations of the courts and the police to make it appear as if the anti-Citizenship (Amendment) Act protestors were responsible for the religious violence. The order quoted, "The coverage was done to target a community that is critical of the Delhi Police’s investigation and project them and their critique in a negative light, thereby unduly hindering the right of the viewer to have a fact based view on the matter and amounted to a sustained campaign to challenge a position, without intimating to the viewers what that position is in its entirety or allowing panellists to explain the same".

Reception
The channel is accused of practicing biased reporting in favour of the ruling Bharatiya Janata Party (BJP) and is considered to be a Godi-media by critics.

According to a 2022 BBC News article, several Indian news anchors including Times Now's Shivshankar are known to shout down their panelists and ranting during their show, and have been accused of bias towards India's governing party, Bharatiya Janata Party and Prime Minister Narendra Modi.

In 2020, Newslaundry reported that Shivshankar had used several dog whistles to negatively portray the Indian Muslims.

On 6 September 2021, Times Now was criticised for a report using video that suggested a Pakistan Air Force jet was hovering over Afghanistan's Panjshir Valley. The video was soon revealed to be a United States Air Force F-15 jet filmed by a YouTube airplane enthusiast in Wales filming the jet within the Mach Loop three months before.

See also
 ET Now
 Times Drive
 Zoom (Indian TV channel)

References

External links
  

 

Mass media in Mumbai
Mass media in Maharashtra
English-language television stations in India
24-hour television news channels in India
The Times Group
Television channels and stations established in 2006
Television channels of The Times Group
Television stations in Mumbai
2006 establishments in Maharashtra